Thornley was a Canadian post-grunge and hard rock band formed by Ian Thornley in 2002. The band was started when Thornley returned to Toronto after the break-up of his earlier band, Big Wreck. With the help of Chad Kroeger of Nickelback, Thornley signed to Kroeger's 604 Records. The last line-up of the band as Thornley had Paulo Neta (guitar), Dave McMillan (bass guitar), Christopher Henry (drums) and the former member of Big Wreck Brian Doherty (guitar). As of 2010, this line-up plays under the name Big Wreck.

History
The band's first album, Come Again, was produced by Gavin Brown, and released on 604 Records in 2004. Thornley toured North America extensively after the album was released and Come Again was certified gold in Canada (50,000 units) by the CRIA, while also producing two No. 1 singles ("So Far So Good" and "Come Again"). Thornley was nominated for two Juno Awards in the wake of Come Again: New Group of the Year and Rock Album of the Year. Thornley's single "Easy Comes" was used in the intro video for the PlayStation Portable game ATV: Offroad: Blazin' Trails.

Thornley has stated in interviews that the return to the name "Big Wreck" serves to signal a shift from trying to write singles and write for maximum commercial success. This is an oblique reference to his time at the label of the Nickelback front man, himself known for admitting to writing to a formula that will provide maximum sales. Thornley was so unhappy with the commercialized sheen, and the meddling on the Come Again album (and its follow-up) that he, for a short time, released the demos for the Come Again album through his My Space page. A listen to these indicates exactly how much meddling and bad direction the songs suffered at the Kroeger-helmed label. The songs are much more raw and powerful than what was released. "It was just time to make a record and somebody brought it up that we should call it a Big Wreck album. There was no one leaning over our shoulders saying, 'You have to do this to get a hit.' And after the last couple of outings, I was pretty miffed with the whole recording process and people making me edit myself."

The band initially included Ken Tizzard (formerly of The Watchmen) on bass guitar and Sekou Lumumba (formerly of Edwin & The Pressure) on drums. However, in October 2005, for unknown reasons, they left Thornley and moved on to other personal projects. Thornley continued touring immediately.

According to Ian Thornley's October 2006 interview with Tina Peek of Crusher magazine, a second album was scheduled for release in early summer 2007. It was expected to be accompanied by a DVD entitled Thornley Live, which was shot across Canada in late 2005 by radio and television arts students from Ryerson University. In a November 2007 interview with the Oshawa based CKGE-FM 94.9 FM "The Rock", Ian Thornley confirmed that the new album was then due to be released in early 2009, suggesting the reason for the delay was that "it's a bit of a headache getting a record made these days through the channels of a label ... so many people have to be on board". He also identified the likely producer as Nick Raskulinecz.

For album's support Thornley toured with Three Days Grace, Thousand Foot Krutch, My Darkest Days, Nickelback, Hawksley Workman and many Canadian bands, and opened for Lenny Kravitz.

On December 12, 2008, Thornley released the first single, "Make Believe", from their second album Tiny Pictures. The album itself was released on February 10, 2009. It was produced by Nick Raskulinecz (Foo Fighters, Velvet Revolver, Rush).

For their second album, Ian Thornley recorded all guitars on the record including lead and rhythm guitar as well as bass guitar. Daniel Adair, the drummer from the Canadian rock band Nickelback, played drums on the album. Chad Kroeger, also of Nickelback, co-wrote a track on the album with Ian Thornley along with Alain Johannes and Natasha Shneider of Eleven, who also co-wrote some of the tracks.

Thornley performed at Rock on the Range Canada in Winnipeg, Manitoba, on June 27, 2009.

Thornley also performed at Flemingpaloozza in Peterborough, Ontario, on September 7, 2009, as part of Fleming college's orientation.

Thornley was also featured at the Paralympics in Vancouver on March 12, 2010.

In 2010, Thornley and Brian Doherty rekindled their friendship which led to the latter filling in for a Thornley show, and then joining the band as they naturally reconnected as musicians.

The band embarked on a Canadian tour titled "An Evening with Thornley and Big Wreck". As a result of the tour's success, the band took on the Big Wreck name, and all existing members of Thornley effectively became members of Big Wreck.

In July 2011, Ian Thornley left 604 records and signed with Anthem/SRO. His new manager is Andy Curran. A new album by Big Wreck, Albatross, has been recorded and was released on March 6, 2012.

Band members
 Ian Thornley - vocals, lead guitar (2002–2011)
 Paulo Neta - rhythm guitar (2009–2011) also in Black Rail; formerly of My Darkest Days and Hurst
 Brian Doherty - rhythm guitar (2010–2011)
 Dave McMillian - bass guitar (2010–2011)
 Brad Park - drums (2011)
Ken Tizzard - bass guitar (2002–2005,2011) in The Watchmen
 Christopher Henry - drums (2010–2011)
 Sekou Lumumba - drums (2002–2005) now in Heavy Young Heathens and Ben Kenney's band; formerly of Edwin & the Pressure and Goodbye Glory
 Liam Killeen - drums (2006)
 Tavis Stanley - guitar (2005–2009) now in Art of Dying
 Cale Gontier - bass guitar (2005–2010) also in Art of Dying and Saint Asonia; former guitar technician for Three Days Grace
 Patrick Benti - rhythm guitar (2009)

Discography

Studio albums

Singles

1 : U.S. single only
2 : Canadian single only

Awards
Juno Awards

See also

Rock music of Canada
Music of Canada

References

Musical groups established in 2002
Musical groups from Toronto
Canadian post-grunge groups
2002 establishments in Ontario